The 2005 Iran earthquake may refer to:

2005 Zarand earthquake, February 22
2005 Qeshm earthquake, November 27

See also
List of earthquakes in Iran